The Spruance-class destroyer was developed by the United States to replace the many World War II–built - and s, and was the primary destroyer built for the U.S. Navy during the 1970s and 1980s. It was named in honor of United States Navy Admiral Raymond A. Spruance, who successfully led major naval battles in the Asiatic-Pacific Theater during World War II such as the Battle of Midway and the Battle of the Philippine Sea.

Introduced in 1975, the class was designed with gas-turbine propulsion, a flight deck and hangar for up to two medium-lift helicopters, all-digital weapons, and automated 127 mm (5-inch) guns. The Spruance class was originally designed to escort a carrier group, primarily for anti-submarine warfare (ASW), with point-defense anti-aircraft warfare (AAW) missiles and limited anti-ship capabilities. Two dozen members of the class were upgraded with Tomahawk cruise missiles for land attack. The Navy retired the class somewhat earlier than planned, decommissioning the last ship in 2005. Most Spruances were broken up or destroyed as targets. Its hull form and propulsion plant were adopted as the foundation of the Ticonderoga-class cruisers constructed in the 1980s. The class was succeeded as the main U.S. destroyer by the Arleigh Burke-class destroyer.

History

Design
Much larger than other destroyers of the era, the Spruances were comparable in size to contemporary guided-missile cruisers (CG and CGN) and U.S. Navy light cruisers (CL) in World War II. This allowed them to accommodate a helicopter flight deck, a first for a U.S. Navy destroyer, and an enclosed hangar with space for up to two medium-lift helicopters, a first for a U.S. Navy destroyer or cruiser. The "Spru-cans" were the first large U.S. Navy ships to use gas turbine propulsion: four General Electric LM2500 gas turbines that generated about 80,000 horsepower (60 MW). This configuration (developed in the 1960s by the Royal Canadian Navy for the s and known as COmbined Gas And Gas, or COGAG) was very successful and used on most subsequent U.S. warships. As of 2010, all U.S. Navy surface combatants (except nuclear-powered aircraft carriers and the LCS-1) used the LM2500 COGAG arrangement, usually with two turbines per shaft.

The ships were initially controversial, especially among members of the United States Congress who believed that their unimposing looks, and their original armament of two guns and an ASROC and Sea Sparrow missile launcher, implied that the vessels were weak compared to Soviet designs that carried large numbers of anti-ship missiles. The Spruance class was also unfavorably compared to earlier U.S. designs that had more visible guns or launchers for Standard medium-range missiles. Their advocates noted that they were successful in their intended ASW role due to their seaworthiness, quiet operation, and ability to operate two helicopters.

The Spruance class received the "DD" designation in the hull classification symbol system which was previously applied to gun destroyers, though their primary armament as designed was missiles. However, their original complement of 8 Sea Sparrow anti-aircraft missiles was only sufficient for point defense, compared to other American destroyers designated as DDG which were designed to provide anti-aircraft warfare screening to the fleet, while some newer DDG ships further added surface-to-surface capabilities for anti-ship or land strike. In the early 1980s, the class received quadruple Harpoon missile launchers that were installed amidships. Six members of the class received Armored Box Launchers Tomahawk surface-to-surface missiles, while a major update from the mid-1980s for 24 members of the class added a 61-cell Vertical Launch Missile System (VLS) for the Tomahawk. Despite these upgrades, the class remained their DD classification because they continued to lack the area anti-aircraft capabilities of guided-missile cruisers (CG and CGN) and destroyers (DDG).

Contracts 
Until the class was named for Admiral Spruance, the acquisition effort had been known as the DX program. It aimed to award the production contract for the entire class of 30 ships to a single shipyard, under the Total Package Procurement concept originated by the Whiz Kids of Robert McNamara's Pentagon. The idea was to reap the benefits of mass construction. After a selection process "noted for political influence and shifting rules," the entire contract was awarded on 23 June 1970 to the Litton-Ingalls shipyard in Pascagoula, Mississippi. Labor and technical problems caused cost overruns and delayed construction.

One additional ship, was ordered on 29 September 1979. Hayler was originally planned as a DDH (Destroyer, Helicopter) design, which would carry more anti-submarine helicopters than the standard design of the Spruance class. Eventually this plan to build a DDH was scrapped and a slightly modified DD-963 class hull was put in commission.

Four additional ships were built originally for the Iranian Navy with the Mark 26/Standard AAW missile system and commissioned as the Kidds for the U.S. Navy. The Kidd-class destroyers used the same hull as the Spruances but they were more advanced general-purpose ships with area anti-air warfare capabilities that the Spruance class lacked. It was once planned to build all of the Spruance class up to this standard, but it was too expensive. A slightly lengthened version of the hull was also used for the s, originally planned as DDG-47-class destroyers but redesignated as cruisers in 1980 to emphasize the additional capability provided by the ships' Aegis combat systems, and their flag facilities suitable for an admiral and his staff.
 
An air-capable mini V/STOL aircraft carrier with fighters and ASW helicopters based on the Spruance hull was seriously considered but not produced.

Upgrades
The Spruance design is modular in nature, allowing for easy installation of entire subsystems within the ship. Although originally designed for anti-submarine warfare, seven vessels—Comte de Grasse, Merrill, Conolly, John Rodgers, Leftwich, Deyo, and Ingersoll—were initially upgraded with the installation of pair of four-round Armored Box Launchers (ABL) for the Tomahawk cruise missile, one each side of the ASROC launcher, giving them a land attack capability. 23 of the remaining vessels then received a more comprehensive upgrade with the installation of a 61-cell Mark 41 Vertical Launch Missile System (VLS) forward, replacing the ASROC launcher and allowing for a greater weapons load to be carried. One of the ABL ships, Deyo, also received the VLS upgrade while Harry W. Hill was the only Spruance that did not receive the Tomahawk as its VLS upgrade was cancelled. Hill and the remaining 6 ABL-equipped ships were the first of the class to be withdrawn from service.

Merrill served as the Navy's test platform for the Tomahawk Cruise Missile Program receiving armored box launchers and test launching a Tomahawk on 19 March 1980. Merrill carried two ABLs and an ASROC launcher into the 1990s until the ASROC launcher was removed.
David R. Ray tested the RAM system in the 1980s, but had the system removed after the tests.
Oldendorf was the test platform for the AN/SPQ-9B Anti-ship Missile Defense (ASMD) Fire control Radar to be outfitted on the s. The AN/SPQ-9B is used to detect all known and projected sea-skimming missiles.
Arthur W. Radford tested the Advanced Enclosed Mast/Sensor system which helped in the mast design of the San Antonio-class amphibious transport dock ships.

At least ten VLS ships, including Cushing, O'Bannon, and Thorn, had a 21-cell Mark 49 RIM-116 Rolling Airframe Missile launcher mounted on the starboard fantail.

Spruance-class destroyers fired 112 land attack Tomahawks during Operation Desert Storm.

Decommissioning
In order to save $28 million a year, the Navy accelerated the decommissioning of the Spruance class, though they could have served to 2019 had they been maintained and updated. Despite the recent modifications to the Spruance and Kidd classes, they were still considered expensive and manpower-intensive to operate, while the succeeding Arleigh Burke class were more capable and versatile due to their Aegis combat system while also being more cost-efficient, and by the end of the 1990s, many Arleigh Burke-class destroyers had entered the fleet. While the early Flight I Arleigh Burke ships only had a flight deck, Flight IIA and subsequent vessels added the enclosed hangar which made their aviation facilities comparable to the Spruance class.

The Navy planned to replace its current destroyers and cruisers with the new  (DDG-1000) destroyers, but the 2010 Defense budget funded the construction of only three DDG-1000s. Cushing was unsuccessfully offered to the Pakistan Navy before being sunk as a target on 29 April 2009. The four Kidd-class destroyers were decommissioned in 1998 and were sold to Taiwan in 2005 and 2006.

Few Spruances were preserved in storage like some older classes or offered up for sale to foreign navies. Some were broken up and most of the rest were sunk as targets in various fleet exercises. One exception is the ex-, which replaced the ex- in 2005 as the Self Defense Test Ship. The remote-controlled SDTS tows a target barge, allowing crews to fire live weapons at a ship-like moving target.

Ships in class

Gallery

See also
Ticonderoga-class cruiser

References

External links

Spruance-class destroyers at Destroyer History Foundation
News story: "Last Spruance-Class Destroyer Decommissioned"

 

Destroyer classes